The Lagonda V12 is a large car produced by the British Lagonda company from 1938 until 1940. It was first shown at the 1936 London Motor Show but production did not commence until 1938.

The V12 model featured an all new 4480 cc 60 degree V12 engine designed by W. O. Bentley. The engine has a combined cylinder block and upper crankcase cast in iron with a light alloy lower crankcase. The cylinder heads are cast iron. Each bank of six cylinders has its own single overhead camshaft, chain driven, and its own distributor driven from the back of the camshaft. Twin downdraught SU carburettors are located between the engine blocks.  is developed at 5000rpm.

The chassis was also new and features independent torsion bar front suspension and live rear axle with hypoid final drive. The braking system is Lockheed hydraulic.

The engine is connected to a four-speed gearbox with centrally mounted change lever.

Only ten cars were built with the longest bodywork.

Even with a saloon body the car could reach 100 mph.

Two modified V12s with four carburettor engines were entered for the 1939 24 Hours of Le Mans where they finished third and fourth.

A 1939 version of the Drophead coupe was featured in an episode of The Twilight Zone called “A Thing About Machines” as a car possessed, terrorizing the main character. The car was driven by stuntmen ducking below the dash or by drivers dressed in all black or white to portray the car as driverless, chasing Mr. Finchley (probably based on Robert Benchley) to his death.

The Lagonda V12 featured prominently in Roald Dahl's adult books My Uncle Oswald and the short story The Visitor (in the collection Switch Bitch). In the stories Dahl discusses taking delivery of a 1938 Lagonda with custom coachwork and a set of horns that play Mozart's "son gia mille e tre" in perfect pitch and seats "upholstered in fine-grain alligator and the panelling to be veneered in yew... because I prefer the colour and grain of English yew to that of any other wood".

References

V12
Cars introduced in 1938